Maoricicada myersi , also known as Myers' cicada, is a species of insect that is endemic to New Zealand. This species was first described by Charles Fleming in 1971.

References

Cicadas of New Zealand
Insects described in 1971
Endemic fauna of New Zealand
Cicadettini
Endemic insects of New Zealand